Waegwan station is a railway station on the Gyeongbu Line in South Korea.

External links
 Cyber station information from Korail

Railway stations in North Gyeongsang Province
Chilgok County
Railway stations in Korea opened in 1905